William Hillary M.D. (1697–1763) was an English physician, known as an author on tropical diseases.

Life
Hillary's background was a Quaker family in Wensleydale, Yorkshire. He was a pupil of Hermann Boerhaave at Leyden University, where he graduated M.D. in 1722, writing a dissertation on intermittent fevers. He began in medical practice at Ripon, moving to Bath, Somerset in 1734, and to Barbados in 1752. He returned to London in 1758, where he died 22 April 1763.

Works
Hillary was an observer of the weather and prevalent diseases. His records began at Ripon in 1726, a year in advance of the corresponding work by Clifton Wintringham senior at York. They resumed in Barbados, and continued until he left the colony, 30 May 1758. The first series was published in the appendix to his second edition of Rational and Mechanical Essay on the Small-pox, London, 1740; 1st edition, London, 1735. The Barbados records are given in his major work Observations on the Changes of the Air, and the Concomitant Epidemical Diseases in the Island of Barbados, to which is added a Treatise on the Bilious Remittent Fever … (yellow fever), London, 1759. It contains the first description of tropical sprue.

Other writings were:

 An Enquiry into the … Medicinal Virtues of Lincomb Spaw Water, near Bath, London, 1743. 
 The Nature, Properties, and Laws of Motion of Fire, London, 1759. 
 The Means of Improving Medical Knowledge, London, 1761.

Notes

 
Attribution
 

1697 births
1763 deaths
18th-century English medical doctors
English medical writers
People from Ripon
Medical doctors from Yorkshire